Sheikh Said, also spelled Shaikh and/or Sa'id, Sa'īd, Saïd, Saeed may refer to:

People
Mustafa Abu al-Yazid, al-Qaeda commander in Afghanistan
Sa'id ibn Zayd, companion of Muhammad
 Sheikh Sa'id bin Tahnun, Sheikh of Abu Dhabi 1845–1855 (lived c. 1827–1856)
Sheikh Said, leader of the Kurdish movement in Turkey in 1925
Saeed Abubakr Zakaria (Afa Seidu), leader of Anbariya Sunni Community in Tamale, Ghana
Ekrima Sa'id Sabri, Grand Mufti of Jerusalem and Palestine until 2006

Places
Cheikh Saïd, peninsula of Yemen facing Perim briefly occupied by French merchants in 1868, named after Sa'id ibn Zayd